is a railway station in Tatsumi, Kōtō, Tokyo, Japan. Its station number is Y-23. The station opened on 8 June 1988, and consists of an island platform serving two tracks.

Line
 Tokyo Metro Yūrakuchō Line

Platform layout
The station consists of an underground island platform serving two tracks

Surrounding area 
 Shinonome Station (Tokyo)
 Tokyo Tatsumi International Swimming Center

Stations of Tokyo Metro
Tokyo Metro Yurakucho Line
Railway stations in Tokyo
Railway stations in Japan opened in 1988